Luis Manuel Rodríguez (17 June 1937 – 8 July 1996) was a Cuban professional boxer. Known as "El Feo", he began his career in pre-Castro Havana. In Cuba, he twice defeated the ill-fated future welterweight champion Benny Paret. He held the WBA, WBC, and lineal welterweight titles in 1963, and challenged once for the WBA, and WBC middleweight titles in 1969.

After the Cuban Revolution, Rodríguez campaigned in the United States. Fighting out of Miami, Rodriguez decisioned top welterweights such as Virgil Akins and Rudell Stitch.

Professional career
He was unbeaten in 36 fights before losing a split decision to Emile Griffith in a 1960 non-title fight. In 1963, Rodriguez and Griffith fought twice for the lineal welterweight title. Rodriguez defeated Griffith by a unanimous decision to win the title, but Griffith regained it three months later with a split decision. Their fourth and final meeting came in 1964, with Griffith retaining the welterweight title with a split decision.

Rodriguez was trained by Angelo Dundee at the old 5th Street Gym in Miami Beach alongside Ralph Dupas, Willie Pastrano, Florentino Fernández and Pinklon Thomas.

Rodriguez was ringside and provided ancillary television commentary for the nationally televised Thursday night, 21 March 1963 Dodger Stadium featherweight championship bout between reigning champ Davey Moore and Sugar Ramos, won after ten rounds by technical knockout (TKO) by Ramos and resulting within the hour in a comatose state for Moore, and ultimately his death on 25 March. He had just beaten Griffith (who had himself fought Benny Paret in another tragic fight) for the world Welterweight title in the same program. Moore's death was memorialized by recording artist Bob Dylan in his long-unreleased (but widely bootlegged) song, "Who Killed Davey Moore?" (the complete telecast of the fight is available on YouTube, as are several of Dylan's various performances of the song.)

In November 1969, Rodriguez challenged Nino Benvenuti in Rome, Italy, for the middleweight world title. In the eleventh-round, slightly ahead on points but tiring and badly cut, Benvenuti suddenly landed a perfect left hook that left Rodriguez on the floor for 5 minutes.

Rodriguez retired in 1972. He was inducted into the International Boxing Hall of Fame in 1997.

In 2009 The Ring magazine ranked Rodriguez as the third-greatest Cuban boxer of all time, behind Kid Gavilán and Kid Chocolate.

Eastern Airlines Flight 202
Rodriguez and his trainers were among 33 passengers on Eastern Airlines flight 202 from Miami to Dallas, Texas, when that flight got hijacked and taken to Cuba on July 24, 1961. Rodriguez was fearful for his life since he had escaped from Cuba recently. However, Cuban authorities allowed the plane and its passengers to return to the United States without further incident. Rodriguez was on his way to a fight versus Curtis Cokes, which he eventually lost by split decision some days later, on August 3.

Professional boxing record

See also

List of world welterweight boxing champions

References

External links

 

1937 births
1996 deaths
Cuban male boxers
Cuban people of African descent
Sportspeople from Camagüey
World Boxing Association champions
World Boxing Council champions
The Ring (magazine) champions
Welterweight boxers
Middleweight boxers
World welterweight boxing champions
International Boxing Hall of Fame inductees